The Shining Adventure is a 1925 American silent drama film directed by Hugo Ballin and starring Percy Marmont, Mabel Ballin, and Ben Alexander.

Plot
As described in a film magazine review, a philanthropic but not very practical woman is admired by a rugged doctor who in serving the poor finds in a tenement house the sister of the philanthropist. She is in poor mental and physical health and her baby son is not properly cared for. The doctor gives the child into the rich woman’s care and the mother disappears. The rich woman neglects the child, and finally it wanders to the neighborhood of its old home. The boy’s mother, who is now definitely demented, finds him, and loses him again, the last time by death. Then she reveals her identity to her sister. Conscience stricken, the rich woman promises to make amends.

Cast

References

External links

1925 drama films
1920s English-language films
American silent feature films
Silent American drama films
American black-and-white films
Films directed by Hugo Ballin
1920s American films